Ząbrsko may refer to the following places in Poland:

Ząbrsko Dolne
Ząbrsko Górne